The 1971–72 Detroit Red Wings season was Marcel Dionne's rookie season. The Red Wings placed fifth to miss the playoffs.

Offseason

Regular season
Head coach Doug Barkley won just 3 of the first 11 games before being replaced by Johnny Wilson.

During his first season for Detroit in 1971–72, Marcel Dionne set an NHL record for scoring by a rookie with 77 points. This record has since been surpassed.

Season standings

Schedule and results

Player statistics

Forwards
Note: GP = Games played; G = Goals; A = Assists; Pts = Points; PIM = Penalty minutes

Defencemen
Note: GP = Games played; G = Goals; A = Assists; Pts = Points; PIM = Penalty minutes

Goaltending
Note: GP = Games played; W = Wins; L = Losses; T = Ties; SO = Shutouts; GA = Goals against; GAA = Goals against average

Awards and records
 Marcel Dionne, NHL record (since broken), Most points by a rookie with 77 points.

Transactions
The Red Wings were involved in the following transactions during the 1971–72 season:

Trades

Draft picks

See also
 1972 in Michigan

References
Red Wings on Hockey Database

Detroit
Detroit
Detroit Red Wings seasons
Detroit Red Wings
Detroit Red Wings
1971 in Detroit
1972 in Detroit